The following are the national records in athletics in Montenegro maintained by the Atletski Savez Crne Gore (ASCG).

Outdoor

Key to tables:

h = hand timing

Men

Women

Indoor

Men

Women

Notes

References
General
Montenegrin Athletics Records 31 October 2019 updated
Specific

External links
ASCG web site

Montenegro
Records
Athletics